Emma Slater (born December 25, 1988) is an English-American professional dancer and choreographer. She is best known for her appearances on Dancing with the Stars.

Personal life
Emma Slater was raised in Tamworth, Staffordshire, England, where she joined local stage schools by taking part in numerous productions at an early age. She has a twin sister, Kelly, a costume designer and stylist on Dancing with the Stars. At the age of 10, Slater started her training in ballroom and Latin American dance.  In the early years of competing, she won a number competitions in England.
At 15, she appeared in a George Michael music video "Round Here" produced by Bikini Films on location in London.  Later that year, Slater took part in the fitness video "Latinasize" again filmed at the Pinewood Studios in London England. She dated fellow Dancing with the Stars member Sasha Farber from 2011 to 2014. In December 2015, Farber made a post on his Instagram account confirming that he and Slater were back together. On 4 October 2016, Farber proposed to Slater during a broadcast of Dancing with the Stars. Slater married Farber on 25 March 2018, with fellow Dancing with the Stars pros Lindsay Arnold, Witney Carson, and Jenna Johnson serving as bridesmaids, and Derek Hough serving as one of Farber's groomsmen. She became an American citizen in December 2020. On April 2022, her and Farber separated and on February 2023, Slater filed for divorce.

Competitive dancing

Slater has numerous titles to her name. In 2005, at the age of 16, she won the British Under 21 Latin American Championships at the Blackpool Closed 2005. She won the 2006 United Kingdom Under 21 Latin American Championships at the Bournemouth Pavilions, England. Ranked in the world's top 10, Slater went on to represent the UK in competitions around the world.

Theatre

At 16, Slater joined the hit theatre show ‘Simply Ballroom’ touring UK, including Theatre Royal, Drury Lane in London's West End, United Arab Emirates and South Africa.  While in South Africa Slater appeared on Dancing with the South African Stars with her celebrity partner TV Host Dalen Lance.  Following Simply Ballroom, Slater had an extended run in London's West End with theatre shows; Dirty Dancing at the Aldwych Theatre where she was the Principal Latin Dancer/Ballroom Supervisor, but also understudied and played the principal role of Lisa Houseman, ‘Cheek to Cheek’ at The Coliseum and ‘Latin Fever’ at the Peacock Theatre.

In 2009 Slater joined the stage show Burn the Floor for the China tour initially but later joined the cast for an extended run at the Longacre Theatre on Broadway New York City and a world tour covering: Belgium, Holland, Australia, Japan, South Korea, Canada, New Zealand, West End London, a nine-month USA multi-city tour.  She also danced and advised on UK's ITV Popstar to Opera Star on a number of occasions.

Mamma Mia! 

In 2008, Slater was featured   in the Universal Pictures movie Mamma Mia! starring Meryl Streep, Pierce Brosnan and Colin Firth, directed by Phyllida Lloyd – this included singing on the Grammy nominated soundtrack for the movie with the cast, produced by ABBA.  The movie was shot in part on the Greek island of Skopelos but primarily inside Pinewood Studios London.

Dancing with the Stars 
In March 2012, Slater joined the fourteenth season on the American edition of Dancing with the Stars as a troupe dancer, where she danced and choreographed all of the opening dance numbers including the finale. 
Later that year, she choreographed Usher at the Billboard Music Awards in Las Vegas including partner work with co-choreographer and also troupe member, Sasha Farber.

After three seasons of being a troupe member, she was announced as one of the new female professional dancers for the seventeenth season of the show in September 2013. Her celebrity partner was award-winning comedian, singer and actor, Bill Engvall. Despite receiving low scores from the judges for most of the season, they were able to reach the finals but were eliminated at the end of the first night, landing them in 4th place. For season 18, she returned as a professional dancer partnered with movie actor Billy Dee Williams. Due to a back injury on Billy Dee, they withdrew from the competition on Week 3. For season 19, she was paired with race-car driver Michael Waltrip and they finished in 7th place. For season 20, she paired with LMFAO singer Redfoo but on week 2, they were the first couple eliminated. For season 21 she paired with Vine star Hayes Grier. They were eliminated on Week 7 and finished in 8th place. Slater did not participate in Season 22 of the reality show.

Slater returned for season 23 and was paired with former Texas governor and two time presidential candidate Rick Perry. They were eliminated on week 3 of competition and finished in 12th place. She returned for season 24 and was paired with NFL running back Rashad Jennings; Jennings and Slater won the competition on 23 May 2017, marking Slater's first win.

For season 25, Slater was partnered with realtor, and Property Brothers co-host, Drew Scott. They made the finals of the competition but were eliminated on night one, finishing in 4th place.

For season 26, Slater was paired with former MLB outfielder Johnny Damon. They were eliminated on the first week of competition, tying in 9th place with Jamie Anderson and Artem Chigvintsev.

For season 27, she was partnered with actor & country music singer John Schneider. The couple was eliminated on week 7 of competition and finished in joint 7th place with DeMarcus Ware and Lindsay Arnold.

She also did a junior version (Dancing With The Stars Jrs.) The show hosted by Jordan Fisher and Frankie Muniz and judges Adam Rippon, Mandy Moore and Valentin Chmerkovskiy. She mentored Raven's Home actor Jason Maybaum and pro Elliana Walmsley. They got out at week 5.

For season 28, Slater was paired with actor James Van Der Beek. Despite earning high scores from the judges throughout the season and being considered frontrunners to win, the couple was eliminated during the semi-finals of the competition where they finished in 5th place.

For season 29, Slater was paired with former NBA player Charles Oakley. They were the first couple to be eliminated and finished in 15th place.

For season 30, Slater was paired with country singer Jimmie Allen. They finished in 7th place.

For season 31, Slater was paired with actor and model Trevor Donovan. They reached the semi-finals and finished in 6th place. 

Scores out of 40 are adjusted to be out of 30.

Season 17: with celebrity partner: Bill Engvall (average: 22.5)

 Former professional dancer and two-time champion, Julianne Hough became Goodman's replacement as judge for that week, due to his commitments with the British version of the show, Strictly Come Dancing.
 For week 8 singer Cher was the guest judge for Len.
 For week 10 former pro Maksim Chmerkovskiy was a guest judge.

Season 18: with celebrity partner: Billy Dee Williams (average: 15.0)

Season 19: with celebrity partner: Michael Waltrip (average: 25.9)

1Score given by guest judge Kevin Hart in place of Goodman.

2The American public scored the dance in place of Goodman with the averaged score being counted alongside the three other judges.

3This week only, for "Partner Switch-Up" week, Waltrip performed with Witney Carson instead of Slater. Slater performed with Tommy Chong.

4Score given by guest judge Jessie J in place of Goodman.

5Score given by guest judge Pitbull in place of Goodman.

Season 20: with celebrity partner: Redfoo (average: 26.5)

Season 21: with celebrity partner: Hayes Grier (average: 24.2)

1 Score given by guest judge Alfonso Ribeiro.

2 This week only, for "Partner Switch-Up" week, Grier performed with Allison Holker instead of Slater. Slater performed with Alek Skarlatos.

3 Score by guest judge Maksim Chmerkovskiy.

4 Score given by guest judge Olivia Newton-John.

Season 23: with celebrity partner: Rick Perry (average: 21.7)

Season 24: with celebrity partner: Rashad Jennings (average: 36.0)
This season was Slater's first ever win in the competition. This also makes her the first British person (both celebrity or professional dance partner) to win the show.

1 Score given by guest judge Nick Carter.2 Score given by guest judge Mandy Moore.

Season 25: with celebrity partner: Drew Scott (average: 23.8)

1 Score given by guest judge Shania Twain.2 Score given by guest judge Julianne Hough.

Season 26: with celebrity partner: Johnny Damon (average: 18.0)

Season 27: with celebrity partner: John Schneider (average: 22.2)

Season 28: with celebrity partner: James Van Der Beek (average: 25.1)

1 Score given by guest judge Leah Remini.

2 Score given by guest judge Joey Fatone.

Season 29: with celebrity partner Charles Oakley (Average: 13.5)

References

External links

Living people
English female dancers
English choreographers
American female dancers
American choreographers
People from Sutton Coldfield
People from Tamworth, Staffordshire
Participants in American reality television series
Dancing with the Stars (American TV series) winners
English twins
Naturalized citizens of the United States
21st-century English women
21st-century American women
1988 births